It's Christmastime Again, Gerald Walker is the second Christmas album and third studio album by American recording artist Gerald Walker. It is the first album released as Gerald Walker & The Family and was released in the United States on November 17, 2011 by One Step at a Time Music.

Background
Originally announced as a re-release of Walker's 2010 A Gerald Walker Christmas EP, the idea was later abandoned and seven new original songs we're then recorded. This is Gerald Walker's second Christmas-themed album mirrored after the popular comic strip Peanuts by Charles M. Schulz. It's Christmastime Again, Gerald Walker and his inaugural A Gerald Walker Christmas EP were named after A Charlie Brown Christmas and It's Christmastime Again, Charlie Brown respectively. This also served as Gerald Walker's third release in 2011.

Singles
The album's first single "Christmas Everyday", produced by longtime collaborator Chemist, was also written and co-produced by Walker himself. It contained an interpolation of Fred Hammond & Radical For Christ's song of the same name and was released November 10, 2011.

Track listing

Credits
Gerald Walker - (Vocals)
Cardo - (Producer)
Chemist - (Producer)
RMB Justize - (Producer)
Matt Richards - (Mastering)
Tayse Solo - (Engineer, Additional)
Thurston "RoyalT" Magill - (Saxophone)
Edward "Sledgren" Murray (Producer, Executive)
Ronald "Cardo" LaTour (Producer, Executive)
Ebony Haynes - (Publicity)

References

Christmas albums by American artists
Gerald Walker albums
2011 Christmas albums
Albums produced by Cardo